is a Japanese politician of the Democratic Party of Japan and a former member of the House of Representatives in the Diet (national legislature).

Early life and education
A native of Osaka, Osaka, Fujimura was born on 3 November 1949. He studied engineering at Hiroshima University.

Career
he was elected to the House of Representatives for the first time in 1993 as a member of the Japan New Party. He lost in 2005 election but was reelected in 2009. In September 2011, he was appointed as Chief Cabinet Secretary in the cabinet of then prime minister Yoshihiko Noda. He was also the Minister for the Abduction Issue.

He lost his seat in the 16 December 2012 general election. He left office on 26 December 2012.

References

External links 
 Official website in Japanese.

Living people
1949 births
Members of the House of Representatives (Japan)
People from Osaka
Japan New Party politicians
Democratic Party of Japan politicians
Noda cabinet
Hiroshima University alumni
21st-century Japanese politicians